What If We is the second studio album by contemporary Christian musician Brandon Heath. It was released on August 19, 2008 through Provident Label Group. The album debuted at No. 73 on the Billboard 200. During mid and late 2008, the album's first single "Give Me Your Eyes" stayed at No. 1 on R&Rs Christian CHR format for 13 consecutive weeks, and was the second most played song of 2008 for the same format. The album received a Grammy Award nomination in 2009 for Best Pop Gospel Album.

 Background 

Before the record's release, there was originally a batch of 40 songs prepared as possible tracks. Brandon Heath said that he and producer Dan Muckala worked closely together in the process of deciding the final 11-track list; "I'll always love the ones that got left behind too, and who knows—they may make the next record", he says.

 Release 

What If We was released on August 19, 2008 through the Provident Label Group in the United States. It debuted at No. 73 on the Billboard 200, being his first album to chart on the 200. It also debuted at No. 3 on Nielsen SoundScan's chart for Christian albums, selling over 7,100 copies in the first week.

The album's first single "Give Me Your Eyes" was released in July 2008. In its first week of online release the song made nearly 6,000 downloads. By the second week, another 6,700 copies were sold. "Give Me Your Eyes" stayed at No. 1 on the iTunes Store Christian section from July through February for seven consecutive months, achieving more than 70,000 digital downloads by September 2008. In early 2009, "Wait and See" was released as the album's second single. It reached NO. 5 on Billboards Hot Christian Songs chart by August 2009.

 Music and lyrical themes 

The single "Give Me Your Eyes" has been compared to Mat Kearney's musical style, described by Christianity Today as "joining acoustic pop with a slight hip-hop shuffle", its lyrics being inspired by "people-watching at an airport – pleading for God's insight and compassion when viewing others".

 Critical reception 

Farias of Allmusic notes that this album seeks answers, but "is far from having all the answers -- and for that matter, it's all too staid to reinvent the CCM wheel -- but it's likable and faith-assuring enough to further establish Heath as a singer/songwriter on the rise."

Cartwright of CCM Magazine stated that "just the title alone will pique the curiosity of any seeker, eager to run with Brandon after the elusive. Mr. Heath doesn't disappoint, striking all the right chords on this, his sophomore effort." Also, Cartwright noted this album as being an "endearing 11-song journey, replete with fanciful arrangements, lyrical imagination and an authentic vocal that makes every step a joy."

Hellman of Christian Music Review gave the idea this album "wouldn't sit atop my favorite albums list, it was a solid 40 minutes of time well spent."

Breimeier of Christianity Today alluded to this album as sending Heath "well on the way toward developing his likable sound and relatable personality into rewarding songcraft".

Bridge of Cross Rhythms said this album by Heath "asks the question of Christians to see what Jesus sees in our world today so we can act. In 11 beautifully crafted pop songs Heath challenges Christians to change the world."

Mabee of Jesus Freak Hideout talked about "if you enjoyed Brandon Heath's debut, are a fan of Mat Kearney or Matthew West, or you're simply looking for a feel-good, melody-driven record, pick up What If We. While the singer/songwriter's debut was powerful and impressive, his second outing is definitely one that you'll be playing long after the summer is over."

Watson of Jesus Freak Hideout noted that this album "takes the best aspects of his debut and builds on them."

Davies of Louder Than the Music said of Heath's second album that it "isn't bad with its observational lyrics and same style acoustic guitar, sadly that style becomes tiresome." Furthermore, Davies alluded to the album as containing "highlights and some great points, but after a listen through there wasn't much that drew me back for a second listen."

Davis of New Release Tuesday noted that Heath's work is a "great 2nd album and a slight improvement in my opinion, which is refreshing."

Nathan of New Release Tuesday gave this album "a pretty solid effort all around, as there is a nice mix of emotional and inspirational pop and adult contemporary. His ballads are strong but there is nothing really exceptional musically. Good lyrics abound and Brandon Heath succeeds with his questions and ahis sophomore piece".

Dickinson of The Phantom Tollbooth envisioned this album as being "a huge step forward for Brandon Heath. He's a maturing artist that continues to prepare himself for even bigger successes."

Track listing

Personnel 
 Brandon Heath – vocals 
 Dan Muckala – keyboards, programming, arrangements 
 Charlie Lowell – keyboards (6)
 Chuck Butler – guitars, bass 
 Adam Lester – guitars 
 Stephen Mason – guitars (6)
 Matt Odmark – guitars (6)
 Brent Milligan – bass 
 Gabe Ruschival – bass (6)
 Jeremy Lutito – drums 
 Dan Haseltine – vocals (6)

Production 
 Dan Muckala – producer, engineer 
 Terry Hemmings – executive producer 
 Jordyn Thomas – A&R 
 Jesse Thompson – engineer 
 F. Reid Shippen – mixing 
 Kevin Shultz – editing 
 Andrew Mendelson – mastering

Charts

Album

Singles

References 

2008 albums
Brandon Heath albums
Reunion Records albums